Antigua and Barbuda competed at the 2022 Commonwealth Games held in Birmingham, England. This was Antigua and Barbuda's 11th appearance at the Commonwealth Games.

Antigua and Barbuda's team consisted of 13 athletes (ten men and three women) competing in four sports.

Competitors
The following is the list of number of competitors participating at the Games per sport/discipline.

Athletics

Men
Track and road events

Field events

Women
Track and road events

Boxing

Cycling

Two male road cyclists were selected to the team.

Road
Men

Track
Points race

Scratch race

Swimming

Men

Women

References

Nations at the 2022 Commonwealth Games
Antigua and Barbuda at the Commonwealth Games
2022 in Antigua and Barbuda sport